Patrick Price may refer to:

Patrick T. Price, state legislator in Arkansas in 1877
Patrick Lucien Price, game designer and editor
Patrick Price, actor who played Nurse Jeffrey
Patrick Price (writer), see 14th Lambda Literary Awards
Patrick Price (born 1994), better known as ACHES, professional Call of Duty player

See also
Pat Price (disambiguation)